The East Coast Rapist is a criminal who has committed a number of rapes in Maryland, Virginia, Connecticut and Rhode Island since 1997. Police had DNA evidence from the first attacks, but had not matched the DNA in any criminal database. On March 4, 2011, police in Connecticut arrested 39-year-old trucker and New Haven resident Aaron H. Thomas after claiming to have matched his DNA to that of the rapist from a cigarette butt he discarded. Thomas underwent police questioning. On March 5, 2011, jailers reported that Thomas attempted to hang himself while in a jail cell.

The rapist's modus operandi was to trail the women he selected as victims to learn about their personal lives and then attack them under cover of night. He usually approached the victim in an open area, talked to her briefly, and then forced her into a more secluded area to rape her. He used handguns, knives, a screwdriver, and a broken bottle as weapons during the attacks. On four occasions, he attacked more than one victim in the same incident.

On March 1, 2013, Thomas was sentenced to three life terms in prison plus an additional 80 years for his Halloween 2009 attack on three teenaged trick-or-treaters in Prince William County, Virginia, having pleaded guilty to said attack in November 2012. Later in March 2013, Thomas was sentenced to two additional life terms for a May 2001 rape and abduction at a Leesburg apartment complex, having pleaded guilty to said attack in November 2012. Later in March 2013, Thomas was indicted on six counts of first-degree rape and multiple related charges in Prince George's County, Maryland, and, as of March 26, 2013, faced a total of 54 charges in said county.

In June 2015, Thomas pleaded guilty to three rapes that took place in Prince George's County, Maryland, between 1997 and 2001 and received three more life terms that are to be served concurrently with time being served in Virginia. Prosecutors also dropped charges against Thomas in three cases because of a lack of evidence.

Crimes

References

External links 
 East Coast Rapist Police Site

American rapists